Zip Style Method is the sixth album by John Cooper Clarke, originally released in 1982. He is again backed by The Invisible Girls, a band masterminded by producer Martin Hannett who contributes bass and guitar to the songs.

Track listing
All tracks written and arranged by John Cooper Clarke, Martin Hannett and Steve Hopkins
"Midnight Shift" - 6:25
"New Assassin" - 3:00
"The Face Behind the Scream" - 3:34
"I Travel in Biscuits" - 3:15
"The Day the World Stood Still" - 3:44
"A Heart Disease Called Love" - 3:30
"The Ghost of Al Capone" - 4:38
"Ninety Degrees in My Shades" - 3:37
"The Day My Pad Went Mad" - 3:09
"I Wanna Be Yours" - 2:02
"Drive She Said" - 2:58
"Night People" - 3:58

Personnel
John Cooper Clarke – vocals
The Invisible Girls
Paul Burgess – drums, percussion
Steve Williams – bass guitar
Steve Hopkins – keyboards
Martin Hannett - bass, guitar
Richard Darbyshire, Trevor Spencer
Technical
Laurence Diana, Ken Goodwin, Tim Harris - engineer
Rosław Szaybo - design
Niall Doull-Connolly - photography

References

External links 
Lyrics and liner notes

John Cooper Clarke albums
1982 albums
Albums produced by Martin Hannett
Epic Records albums